Ricardo Antonio Mohamed Matijević (born 2 April 1970) is an Argentine football manager and former player. 

Mohamed played as a striker, making his senior debut with Huracán in 1988 and being sold to Italian club Fiorentina in 1991. He never played for the side, and served loans at Boca Juniors and Independiente before resuming his career in Mexico. He subsequently started his coaching career in 2003 at his last club Zacatepec, and subsequently won the 2010 Copa Sudamericana with Independiente and three Liga MX titles each with Tijuana, América and Monterrey.

Club career
Born in Buenos Aires, Mohamed made his senior debut with Huracán in 1988, playing in the Primera B Nacional. After subsequently establishing himself as a starter, he helped his side to achieve promotion in the 1989–90 season as champions by scoring the only goal against Los Andes in the decisive match.

Mohamed made his Primera División debut on 19 August 1990, in a 2–2 draw against Deportivo Mandiyú. During that campaign, he scored ten goals as Huracán finished one point shy of a Copa Libertadores play-offs in the Clausura tournament.

In 1991, Mohamed was sold to Serie A side Fiorentina for US$1.2 million, but was successively loaned to Boca Juniors and Independiente back in his home country. He left the club in 1993, and joined Toros Neza in Mexico. His career apexed with Toros Neza when they had made it to the final against Guadalajara in the Verano '97 season alongside other famous players at the time such as Nildeson, Rodrigo Ruiz, and Germán Arangio.

In 1998, after a brief period where he played two Libertadores matches with Club América, Mohamed moved to Monterrey. After playing briefly for Marte, Irapuato, Atlante, Celaya and Zacatepec from 2000 to 2003, he officially retired at the age of 33.

International career
An Argentine international, Mohamed made his debut with the national team in a friendly match against Hungary on 19 February 1991, with Argentina winning the match 2–0. He made four appearances in total, scoring one goal. He was a part of the Argentina squad that won the Copa América tournament in 1991.

Managerial career

Early career
Shortly after retiring, Mohamed took up coaching at his last club Zacatepec in the Ascenso MX, reaching the semifinals of the Liguilla and leaving the club after they changed name to Leones de Morelos. He took over Liga MX side Monarcas Morelia on 23 February 2004, replacing Rubén Omar Romano.

Mohamed was sacked by Morelia in June 2004, after only 13 matches. He subsequently took over Querétaro in the second division before replacing José Luis Trejo at the helm of Chiapas in February 2005.

Mohamed was relieved of his duties in April 2005, and was subsequently replaced by Fernando Quirarte. He subsequently returned to his first club Huracán, achieving a top tier promotion in 2007.

Mohamed resigned in September 2007, and returned to Mexico in the following month after being named Veracruz manager. He resigned the following 27 January, after only eight matches.

On 19 March 2008, Mohamed was appointed in charge of Colón de Santa Fe back in his home country. In September 2010, after attracting the interest of major clubs in the country, he resigned.

Independiente
On 4 October 2010, Mohamed was confirmed as new manager of Independiente. In December, he led side that won the Copa Sudamericana tournament, defeating Brazilian side Goiás 5–3 on penalties in the finals. 

Mohamed announced his resignation from the club on 4 September 2011, after a poor start of the season.

Tijuana
Mohamed would return to Mexico in 2011, and on 19 September of that year, he was announced as the new manager of recently promoted Club Tijuana, replacing Joaquín Del Olmo. He led Tijuana to the Apertura 2012 championship, the first in the club's history, after defeating Toluca 4–1 on aggregate in the finals. 

Mohamed stepped down as Tijuana manager in 2013, so he could move back to Argentina to be closer to his family,

Return to Huracán
Shortly after leaving Tijuana, Mohamed became the manager of Huracán for a second time on 2 July 2013. He resigned from the club in October, after three wins and seven losses in ten matches.

Club América
On 10 December 2013, Mohamed was named the new manager of Club América for the Clausura 2014 tournament after club president Ricardo Peláez confirmed it during an interview with Univisión. He was officially presented to the press on 17 December. At the press conference it was revealed that he had signed a one year contract with the club, with the potential for an extension pending a review of his performance. Mohamed also spoke of the pressure that came with managing América and comparing it to his time with Club Tijuana, saying, "Here I have everything [sic] to lose." His first two signings where Paraguayan center-back Pablo Aguilar, whom he coached while at Tijuana, and Argentine striker Andrés Ríos.

Mohamed's first league match with América came on 4 January 2014 in a 3–0 victory over UANL at the Estadio Azteca. Mohamed suffered his first defeat as América manager on 10 January in a 0–1 loss to Tijuana. Following three consecutive victories against León, Atlas, and Atlante, América suffered defeats to Pachuca and Morelia, both 0–1, the first time they had lost back-to-back games since the Clausura 2012 tournament. The team was criticized for its defensive style of play, with many drawing comparisons to predecessor Miguel Herrera's more offensive-minded tactics and his successful reign at the club, though some believed that a lack of a proper pre-season and the club being in a period of transition were the reasons for the team's poor performances. On 23 February, América were defeated 1–3 by Pumas in the Mexico City derby, ending the club's two-year hegemony over their intracity rival.

On 27 April, following a 1–1 draw at Toluca, América secured their qualification for the playoffs. They would ultimately be eliminated in the quarterfinals by Santos Laguna with a 6–6 aggregate score (América won the first leg 5–3, but lost the second 1–3), with the away goals rule deciding the series. At the post-match press conference, Mohamed stated his hope for continuing on with the club, saying: "I am very content at the club, the board has given me their full support… if nothing strange happens then we [the coaching staff] will surely have a pre-season… I have a contract until December, they have always given me their full support, and it is up to them to decide."

The regular season Apertura 2014 was much more successful from the start, with Club America holding first place lead throughout the season. Turco continued to struggle winning any of the big three derbies during the regular season. Mohamed's laid-back style of managing caused friction with the administrative staff. These instances usually involved long weekend getaways to support Argentina at the 2014 FIFA World Cup Final and going to Europe for an all-star "peace match" for the Pope, among other circumstances.

Going into the liguilla, America's form had dropped significantly and many analyst did not see America making it past the first round. Tensions rose dramatically once America advanced to the semifinal after a nail-biter quarterfinal against Pumas. A few days before the first leg of America's semi-final match against Monterrey, Mohamed dismissed club co-captain Paul Aguilar after an undisclosed locker room incident. During that week, multiple sources said Mohamed would no longer continue at the club regardless of the playoff result. The club morale was further affected once players Luis Angel Mendoza and Jesus Molina were confirmed to be transferring teams before playoffs had ended.

On 6 December 2014, Mohamed announced his departure from the club after the end of the Apertura tournament. He still led the club to the Finals, and lifted the Apertura title after defeating UANL 3–1 on aggregate.

Monterrey
On 16 February 2015, after the release of Carlos Barra as coach, Monterrey appointed Mohamed as their new manager. He made his debut at the helm of the club five days later, in a 2–1 a victory against Querétaro.

Mohamed remained in charge of the Rayados in the following seasons, taking the club to the CONCACAF Champions League twice (2016 and 2018), but still being knocked out by Panamanian side Árabe Unido in the 2016–17 group stage. On 7 May 2018, he resigned.

Celta
On 22 May 2018, La Liga club Celta de Vigo appointed Mohamed as manager on a two-year contract. He was sacked on 12 November, with the team in 14th after 12 matches.

Fourth spell at Huracán
On 28 December 2018, Mohamed returned to Huracán, starting his fourth spell as manager of the club. He resigned the following 23 April, after the club was knocked out of the 2019 Copa Libertadores.

Return to Monterrey
On 9 October 2019, Mohamed returned to Mexico and Monterrey, after being named in charge until the end of the season. On 25 November of the following year, he left on a mutual agreement.

Atlético Mineiro
On 13 January 2022, Mohamed was appointed as manager of Atlético Mineiro of Brazil. On 20 February 2022, Mohamed won his first title with the club, by beating Flamengo in the penalty shootouts of the Supercopa do Brasil match. On 2 April 2022, Mohamed won his second trophy with Atlético, beating arch rivals Cruzeiro in the Campeonato Mineiro final with a 3–1 score. He left the club on 22 July 2022, following a string of poor results in the Campeonato Brasileiro and an exit in the round of 16 of the Copa do Brasil.

Personal life
Mohamed paternal grandfather was Lebanese-Syrian and his paternal grandmother was Argentine, and his maternal grandfather was Croatian and his maternal grandmother was Chilean. His nickname is El Turco ("The Turk"), following the custom in many Latin American countries of using that nickname for people of Arab descent, whose ancestors arrived from the Ottoman Empire.

In June 2006, his nine-year-old son Faryd was killed in a car accident during the World Cup in Germany. Mohamed suffered severe injuries in the accident and was in danger of losing his leg. On 29 December 2019, he fulfilled the promise he made to his son by making Monterrey champions of the Liga MX.

His other son Shayr is also a footballer and a forward. Both worked together at Monterrey in 2020.

Managerial statistics

Honours

Player
Huracán
 Primera B Nacional: 1989–90

Argentina
 Copa América: 1991

Manager
Independiente
 Copa Sudamericana: 2010

Tijuana
 Liga MX: Apertura 2012

América
 Liga MX: Apertura 2014

Monterrey
 Liga MX: Apertura 2019
 Copa MX: Apertura 2017, 2019–20

Atlético Mineiro
 Supercopa do Brasil: 2022
 Campeonato Mineiro: 2022

Individual
 Number 11 retired by Toros Neza as a tribute to his run with the club (1993–98).

References

External links

1970 births
Living people
Footballers from Buenos Aires
Argentine footballers
Argentine football managers
Argentina international footballers
Argentina under-20 international footballers
Argentina youth international footballers
Argentine people of Lebanese descent
Argentine people of Syrian descent
Argentine people of Croatian descent
Argentine people of Chilean descent
Sportspeople of Lebanese descent
Argentine emigrants to Mexico
Naturalized citizens of Mexico
Association football forwards
Club Atlético Huracán footballers
ACF Fiorentina players
Boca Juniors footballers
Club Atlético Independiente footballers
Toros Neza footballers
C.F. Monterrey players
Irapuato F.C. footballers
Atlante F.C. footballers
Club Celaya footballers
Club Atlético Zacatepec players
Liga MX players
Argentine Primera División players
Primera Nacional players
1991 Copa América players
Copa América-winning players
Argentine expatriate footballers
Argentine expatriate sportspeople in Mexico
Expatriate footballers in Mexico
Querétaro F.C. managers
Atlético Morelia managers
Chiapas F.C. managers
Club Atlético Huracán managers
C.D. Veracruz managers
Club Atlético Colón managers
Club Atlético Independiente managers
Club Tijuana managers
Club América managers
RC Celta de Vigo managers
Clube Atlético Mineiro managers
Liga MX managers
Argentine Primera División managers
La Liga managers
Campeonato Brasileiro Série A managers
Argentine expatriate football managers
Argentine expatriate sportspeople in Spain
Argentine expatriate sportspeople in Brazil
Expatriate football managers in Mexico
Expatriate football managers in Spain
Expatriate football managers in Brazil